Mikres Fotografies is the third studio album by Greek singer Giannis Ploutarhos, released in 2001 by Minos EMI.

The title track, "Mikres fotografies", peaked at no.1 on the Greek Singles Chart.

Track listing

Charts

References

2001 albums
Giannis Ploutarhos albums